Richard L. Cevoli (October 24, 1919 – January 18, 1955) served as a United States Naval Aviator and carrier fighter pilot during World War II and the Korean War. Decorated for valor in both conflicts, Cevoli reached the rank of Commander before he was killed in a plane crash in 1955.

Pre-military
Richard Leo Cevoli was a lifelong resident of East Greenwich. He graduated from La Salle Academy and later from Rhode Island State College, where he earned a degree in civil engineering. He worked for the engineering firm, Merritt, Chapman & Scott, and joined the Navy a month after the attack on Pearl Harbor.

Military career

World War II
While serving with Fighting Squadron 18 (VF-18) aboard the U.S.S. Intrepid, Cevoli and other members of the squadron strafed a Japanese battleship during the Battle of Leyte Gulf, silencing many of its guns. The following day, he scored a hit with a 500lb bomb, disabling a Japanese aircraft carrier. Cevoli is also credited with four confirmed air victories and three probables during his service with VF-18.

Korean War
From 1949 until 1951, Cevoli served as the Executive Officer in Fighting Squadron 32 (VF-32) on board the USS Leyte.  In the winter of 1950, he and his pilots provided close in air support against 70,000 Chinese soldiers crossing the Yalu River and enabled 30,000 United Nations soldiers to escape encirclement. He was also division leader for Thomas J. Hudner Jr. and Jesse L. Brown. He radioed for help when Brown was shot down on 4 December 1950, during the mission for which Hudner would receive the Medal of Honor. The story of Brown and Hudner's friendship and service is the subject of Adam Makos' book Devotion, which is currently in production as a feature film. Thomas Sadoski has been cast to play Richard Cevoli.

Post-war service
After the war, Cevoli graduated from the Naval War College. In 1954 he assumed command of Fighting Squadron 73 (VF-73) and attained the rank of Commander. He died when his plane crashed during a training mission.

Awards and honors
  Navy Cross
  Distinguished Flying Cross with one gold award star
  Air Medal with 7 gold award stars
Rhode Island Aviation Hall of Fame - 2005
A post office in East Greenwich was named after him - 2006

See also
http://twoaday18.com/2019/05/27/two-a-day-tales-richard-cevoli/

References

1919 births
1955 deaths
United States Navy officers
Recipients of the Distinguished Flying Cross (United States)
Recipients of the Navy Cross (United States)
United States Navy personnel of World War II
United States Navy personnel of the Korean War
United States Navy pilots of World War II
American Korean War pilots
Recipients of the Air Medal
Aviators killed in aviation accidents or incidents
Naval War College alumni
University of Rhode Island alumni
American civil engineers
People from East Greenwich, Rhode Island
20th-century American engineers
Victims of aviation accidents or incidents in 1955